Jopie van Alphen (born 12 May 1940) is a retired Dutch backstroke swimmer. She was part of the 4 × 100 m medley relay team that set a new world record on 17 July 1955 in Paris.

References

1940 births
Living people
Dutch female backstroke swimmers
World record setters in swimming
Swimmers from Rotterdam
20th-century Dutch women
20th-century Dutch people